MDMF may refer to:
Merlin Depth Maintenance Facility
Multiple Data Message Format, a function within Caller ID